New York's 67th State Assembly district is one of the 150 districts in the New York State Assembly. It has been represented by Democrat Linda Rosenthal since 2006, replacing Scott Stringer.

Geography
District 67 is located in Manhattan, comprising portions of the Upper West Side and Hell's Kitchen. Lincoln Center and a portion of Central Park is within this district.

Recent election results

2022

2020

2018

2016

2014

2012

2010

2008

References

67